Cropper is an English surname. 

Notable people with the surname include:

Angela Cropper, United Nations official from Trinidad and Tobago
Anna Cropper (1938–2007), British stage and television actress
Anton Cropper, American television director and producer
Dene Cropper (born 1983), English former professional footballer
Elizabeth Cropper (born 1944), art historian
Dame Hilary Cropper (1941–2004), English businesswoman
James Cropper (abolitionist) (1773–1840), English businessman, philanthropist, and abolitionist
James Cropper (politician) (1823–1900), English Liberal politician and papermaker.great-great-grandfather of James (businessman)
James Cropper (priest) (died 1938), Anglican priest
James Cropper (businessman) (born 1938), English businessman, great-great-grandson of James (politician)
Jason Cropper (born 1971), American musician, guitarist for Weezer
John Cropper (1797–1876), British philanthropist
Mark Cropper, British businessman, son of James (politician)
Linda Cropper, Australian television actress
Peter Cropper (1945–2015), British violinist, leader of the Lindsay String Quartet
Steve Cropper (born 1941), American guitarist, songwriter and producer
William Cropper (1862–1889), English cricketer and footballer

Fictional characters:
Hayley Cropper, in the British soap opera Coronation Street
Roy Cropper, in Coronation Street